Buslacena was a Roman town and the seat of an ancient Christian bishopric in the Roman province of Africa Proconsularis.

Bishopric
We know of only one bishop of the town, Felix, who attended the Council of Carthage (256) to discuss the issue of the Lapsi. The bishopric survives to day as a titular see of the Roman Catholic Church with only one modern bishop, Alfredo Victor Petit Vergel.

References

Catholic titular sees in Africa
Roman towns and cities in Tunisia